The 2000 Isaacs by-election was held in the Australian electorate of Isaacs in Victoria on 12 August 2000. The by-election was triggered by the death of the sitting member, the Australian Labor Party's Greg Wilton on 14 June 2000. The writ for the by-election was issued on 30 June 2000.

Background
The Labor Party's member for Isaacs, Greg Wilton, committed suicide on 14 June 2000. Wilton's marriage had broken down earlier in the year, and shortly afterwards Victoria Police arrested Wilton after finding him, clearly distressed, with his children in a car in the You Yangs national park. While Wilton's intentions on the day were unclear, unrestrained media coverage of the incident was considered by his colleagues to have contributed to his eventual suicide six weeks later.

The Isaacs by-election was the first election in Australia to be held after the introduction of the Goods and Services Tax on 1 July 2000, and the Liberal Party declined to run a candidate. Labor's preselection was a messy battle with the party's left faction proposing to pre-select Jill Hennessy, the former state president of the Labor Party and an advisor to Premier Steve Bracks. They were overridden by the party's federal executive, who put forward Ann Corcoran, although the change resulted in a convoluted factional deal in which pre-selection ballots were altered after their submission.

Results

Aftermath
The Labor Party held the seat of Isaacs, with a primary vote swing of 8.11 towards them. The lack of a Liberal candidate saw positive primary vote swings towards all the minor parties, in particular the Australian Democrats, the main rival on a two-candidate preferred basis. Ann Corcoran went on to hold the seat in the 2001 and 2004 federal elections, but lost pre-selection prior to the 2007 election.

See also
 List of Australian federal by-elections

References

External links
Isaacs (VIC) By-Election (12 August 2000) Results, Australian Electoral Commission

2000 elections in Australia
Victorian federal by-elections
2000s in Victoria (Australia)